The 1991–92 Elitserien season was the 17th season of the Elitserien, the top level of ice hockey in Sweden. 12 teams participated in the league, and Malmo IF won the championship.

Standings

First round

Final round

Playoffs

External links
 Swedish Hockey League official site
1992 Swedish national championship finals at SVT's open archive 

Swe
1991–92 in Swedish ice hockey
Swedish Hockey League seasons